The list of disasters in Croatia by death toll includes major disasters and accidents - excluding warfare and other intentional acts - that took place on Croatian soil and resulted in 10 or more fatalities:



See also
 List of disasters in Antarctica by death toll
 List of disasters in Australia by death toll
 List of disasters in Canada by death toll
 List of disasters in Great Britain and Ireland by death toll
 List of disasters in New Zealand by death toll
 List of disasters in Poland by death toll
 List of disasters in the United States by death toll

Notes

References

Further reading

Croatia

Disasters
Croatia